is a former Japanese football player. He played for Japan national team.

Club career
Kurobe was born in Anan on March 6, 1978. After graduating from Fukuoka University, he joined Kyoto Purple Sanga in 2000. The club was relegated to J2 League in 2000 and many main players left the club. From 2001, he played as regular player in generation change. In 2002, he played center forward of 3 top forward with wings Daisuke Matsui and Park Ji-sung, and the club won the champions Emperor's Cup their first major title. He moved to Cerezo Osaka in 2005. After that, although he played Urawa Reds in 2006 and JEF United Chiba in 2007, his opportunity to play decreased. In 2008, he moved to J2 League club Avispa Fukuoka and his opportunity to play increased. He moved to Kataller Toyama in 2010 and he played until 2013. In 2014, he moved to Thailand and played for TTM Customs. He retired end of 2014 season.

National team career
On March 28, 2003, Kurobe debuted for Japan national team against Uruguay. He played 4 games for Japan until 2004.

Club statistics

National team statistics

References

External links
 
 
 Japan National Football Team Database

1978 births
Living people
Fukuoka University alumni
Association football people from Tokushima Prefecture
Japanese footballers
Japan international footballers
J1 League players
J2 League players
Kyoto Sanga FC players
Cerezo Osaka players
Urawa Red Diamonds players
JEF United Chiba players
Avispa Fukuoka players
Kataller Toyama players
Expatriate footballers in Thailand
Association football forwards